Arnfinn Kristiansen (born 10 December 1971, Oslo) is a Norwegian bobsledder.

He competed at the 1998 Winter Olympics in Nagano and at the 2002 Winter Olympics in Salt Lake City.

References

External links
 

1971 births
Living people
Sportspeople from Oslo
Norwegian male bobsledders
Olympic bobsledders of Norway
Bobsledders at the 1998 Winter Olympics
Bobsledders at the 2002 Winter Olympics